Captain Sir Jocelyn Bray, DL (7 April 1880 – 12 February 1964) was a British chartered surveyor and land agent who was Chairman of the Thames Conservancy Board from 1938 to 1960.

A member of the ancient Bray family, lords of the manor of Shere, Bray was the son of High Court judge Sir Reginald More Bray.

References 

Knights Bachelor
1964 deaths
Deputy Lieutenants
People educated at Harrow School
Alumni of Trinity College, Cambridge
Surrey Yeomanry
British surveyors
British Army personnel of the Second Boer War
British Army personnel of World War I